Me and My Guitar may refer to:
Me and My Guitar (Chet Atkins album), 1977
Me & My Guitar (Tony Rice album), 1986
"Me and My Guitar" (Tom Dice song), 2010
"Me and My Guitar" (A Boogie wit da Hoodie song), 2020
"Me and My Guitar", a song by James Taylor from Walking Man, covered by Chet Atkins and Tony Rice